List of airports in Timor may refer to:
 List of airports in East Timor
 List of airports in Indonesia, which includes West Timor